Lamayuru or Yuru Monastery ( "Eternal Monastery") is a Tibetan Buddhist monastery in Lamayouro, Leh district, Ladakh, India.

History
A. H. Francke states that, "according to popular tradition," it was originally the foremost Bon monastery in Ladakh; its name means sauwastika and is a popular symbol in Bon for "eternity". Yungdrung is the name of the most popular school of Bon. It is currently affiliated with the Drikung Kagyu school of Buddhism.

The Drikung history states that the Indian scholar Naropa (956-1041 CE) allegedly caused a lake which filled the valley to dry up and founded Lamayuru Monastery. The oldest surviving building at Lamayuru is a temple called Seng-ge-sgang, at the southern end of the Lamayuru rock, which is attributed to the famous builder-monk Rinchen Zangpo (958-1055 CE). Rinchen Zangpo was charged by the king of Ladakh to build 108 gompas, and certainly many gompas in Ladakh, Spiti Valley and the surrounding regions, date from his time.

The gompa consisted originally of five buildings, and some remains of the four corner buildings can still be seen.

Lamayuru is one of the largest and oldest gompas in Ladakh, with a population of around 150 permanent monks resident. It has, in the past, housed up to 400 monks, many of which are now based in gompas in surrounding villages.

Lamayuru is host to two annual masked dance festivals in the second and fifth months of the Tibetan lunar calendar, when all the monks from these surrounding gonpas gather together to pray.

Nearby is Wanla Monastery.

Footnotes

References
Handa, O. C. (1987). Buddhist Monasteries in Himachal Pradesh. Indus Publishing Company, New Delhi. .
Kapadia, Harish. (1999). Spiti: Adventures in the Trans-Himalaya. Second Edition. Indus Publishing Company, New Delhi. .
 Janet Rizvi. (1996). Ladakh: Crossroads of High Asia. Second Edition. Oxford University Press, Delhi. .
 Cunningham, Alexander. (1854). LADĀK: Physical, Statistical, and Historical with Notices of the Surrounding Countries. London. Reprint: Sagar Publications (1977).
Francke, A. H. (1977). A History of Ladakh. (Originally published as, A History of Western Tibet, (1907). 1977 Edition with critical introduction and annotations by S. S. Gergan & F. M. Hassnain. Sterling Publishers, New Delhi.
Francke, A. H. (1914). Antiquities of Indian Tibet. Two Volumes. Calcutta. 1972 reprint: S. Chand, New Delhi.
Sarina Singh, et al. India. (2007). 12th Edition. Lonely Planet. .
Schettler, Margaret & Rolf. (1981) Kashmir, Ladakh & Zanskar. Lonely Planet, South Yarra, Vic., Australia.
Tucci, Giuseppe. (1988). Rin-chen-bzan-po and the Renaissance of Buddhism in Tibet Around the Millenium. First Italian Edition 1932. First draft English translation by Nancy Kipp Smith, under the direction of Thomas J. Pritzker. Edited by Lokesh Chandra. English version of Indo-Tibetica II. Aditya Prakashan, New Delhi. .

External links 

 Lamayuru Gompa
 Photos of Lamayuru, 1280x960

Leh district
Drikung Kagyu monasteries and temples
Buddhist monasteries in Ladakh
Buddhism in Ladakh